Daniel Brands (born 17 July 1987) is a German retired professional tennis player. His career-high singles ranking was world No. 51, achieved in August 2013.

Professional career

2008
Brands began 2008 ranked No. 220. After a few unimpressive tournaments to start the year, he beat no. 132 Aisam Qureshi and no. 193 Simon Stadler en route to a semifinal Challenger finish in Germany in February. In March, he made the quarters of a Challenger in Japan before losing to no. 124 Yen-Hsun Lu, then reached the quarters of a Challenger in Sarajevo, beating no. 169 Matthias Bachinger.

In May, Brands reached the quarterfinals at two more Challengers, beating no. 66 Michael Berrer and no. 114 Brian Dabul, while also winning the doubles title in one and reaching the doubles final in the other. Then, with his ranking at a career-high of no. 210, he beat no. 123 Nicolás Massú, no. 151 Pablo Andújar (who beat him a week earlier), and no. 198 Alex Bogomolov to qualify into the main draw of the 2008 French Open.

2009
Brands made it to the semifinals of the 2009 BMW Open, before losing to Mikhail Youzhny. He lost in the first round of the 2009 French Open to Robert Kendrick.

2010
Brands again bowed out in the first round of the [2010 French Open], but he put up a great performance only to fall short against the eighth seed Frenchman and world no. 10 Jo-Wilfried Tsonga.

Brands made his Wimbledon debut at the 2010 tournament, defeating Igor Andreev in the first round. He continued his run in the second round by upsetting world no. 5 and seventh seed Nikolay Davydenko, who was returning from injury. Brands then saved four match points at two sets to love down against Victor Hănescu, to win while leading the fifth set when Hanescu retired due to injury, and a controversial issue with the crowd. In the fourth round, Brands lost to eventual finalist Tomáš Berdych.

At the 2010 US Open tournament Brands was defeated by countryman Benjamin Becker in the first round in straight sets.
He then accepted a Wildcard for an ATP Challenger Tour event in Braşov, Romania where he bowed out in the first round. The Open de Moselle in Metz was his next tournament. He fell to Tommy Robredo in the first round.

He reached his first quarterfinal of the season at the Thailand Open in Bangkok defeating Illya Marchenko and Thiemo de Bakker, where he saved a matchpoint. He was again knocked out by Benjamin Becker.

2012
Brands lost to Marin Čilić in the Croatia Open.

2013
Brands entered the Australian Open beating 27th seed Martin Klizan before losing to an in-form Bernard Tomic. In the French Open he drew Rafael Nadal in the first round. He shocked Rafa, winning the opening set 6–4 with a punishing serve and huge flat groundstrokes, reminiscent of both Söderling and Rosol, who upset Rafa in the French Open and Wimbledon, respectively. Brands went ahead in the second set tie breaker 3–0, but his level slightly dropped and Nadal's rose. After pulling Nadal off the court with a second serve at 3–2, Brands missed a backhand into the open court that provided the break that Nadal needed to climb back in and win the tiebreaker, 7–4. Brands let down slightly in the next game and was broken for the first time in the match. Nadal upped his game and won the next two sets 6–4 and 6–3. Nadal was quoted by the New York Times as saying, "I don’t know what he's ranked, but he can’t be ranked 60th playing like that. I can’t believe it".

ATP Challenger Tour finals

Singles: 13 (7–6)

Doubles: 5 (3–2)

Performance timelines

Singles

Doubles

Record against top-10 players
Brands' match record against players who have been ranked world No. 10 or higher is as follows. Only ATP Tour main draw results are considered. Players who have been No. 1 are in boldface.

 Gaël Monfils 3–2
 Nikolay Davydenko 2–1
 Roberto Bautista Agut 1–0
 David Ferrer 1–0
 Sébastien Grosjean 1–0
 Janko Tipsarević 1–0
 Marcos Baghdatis 1–1
 Roger Federer 1–1
 Radek Štěpánek 1–1
 Mikhail Youzhny 1–2
 Gilles Simon 1–3
 Kevin Anderson 0–1
 Ernests Gulbis 0–1
 Tommy Haas 0–1
 Ivan Ljubičić 0–1
 Jürgen Melzer 0–1
 Rafael Nadal 0–1
  Cameron Norrie 0–1
 Tommy Robredo 0–1
 Alexander Zverev 0–1
 Tomáš Berdych 0–2
 Juan Martín del Potro 0–2
 Richard Gasquet 0–2
 Marin Čilić 0–3
 Jo-Wilfried Tsonga 0–3

* .

Wins over top-10 players

References

External links
 
 
 
 

1987 births
Living people
German male tennis players
People from Deggendorf (district)
Tennis people from Bavaria
Sportspeople from Lower Bavaria